Goms may refer to:

Goms (region), the upper most part of the Valais, Switzerland
Goms (district), in the canton of Valais, Switzerland
Goms, Valais, a municipality in Valais, Switzerland, created in 2017
GOMS, method in human–computer interaction